The Tempest is an American multinational digital media and entertainment company for women and non-binary individuals that was founded in 2016 by Laila Alawa. Their purpose is to serve as "the destination for diverse women to share, inspire, and celebrate life through storytelling, experiences, and a global community." It is owned by The Tempest, Inc.

History 
The Tempest was founded by Laila Alawa (CEO) in 2016. Alawa had worked at the White House and Congress for three years prior but left to found the new company. In 2017, Alawa tapped Mashal Waqar to join the company as her co-founder. The name of the website alludes to the disruption that diverse storytelling by women brings to the world. As of 2021, Cheddar reported that The Tempest reaches an audience of over 10 million globally.

In 2020, it surpassed 8 million monthly visitors. The Tempest's increasing global popularity among young women is attributed in part to its young staff. Writers are advised to write about stories that interest them; this can range from international politics and up-and-coming beauty influencers to technology and cultural experiences.

On December 22, 2020, The Tempest announced Federica Bocco as the publication's new Editor-in-Chief.

Content 
The Tempest produces editorial and video programming, live events, and social, shareable content delivered across major social media platforms, and covers a variety of categories including style, health, food, entertainment, careers, technology, news, politics, and more.

More than 2,000 contributors identifying as women or non-binary from more than twenty countries regularly contribute original content.
In January 2021, The Tempest launched  a vertical dedicated to 
literary analyses.  Prior to the launch, book reviews on The Tempest were widespread but unfocused.

Impact
A study on ethnic media consumption and production by Professors Matthew D. Matsaganis of Rutgers University and Shirley Yu of The University of Toronto, Canada, found that The Tempest actively creates conversations around the socioeconomics of the digital space, journalistic norms, and personal concepts of identity.

Reception 
Founder and CEO, Laila Alawa, is a Forbes 30 Under 30, called by Forbes "a leader transforming the future of media".

Forbes 30 Under 30 named the company to their Middle East list in 2019.

References

External links

Fashion websites
American entertainment websites
American women's websites
Internet properties established in 2005
Lifestyle websites
Internet properties established in 2016
Mass media about Internet culture
Mass media companies of the United States